Najma Akhtar (born 1953) is an Indian academic and academic administrator. Since April 2019, she has been the Vice Chancellor of the Jamia Millia Islamia, an Indian university. She is also the first woman to hold the post in JMI.

Education
Akhtar was born in 1953. She studied at Aligarh Muslim University, where she was a gold medalist and earned a National Science Talent Scholarship. She has a PhD in Education from Kurukshetra University. She received a Commonwealth Fellowship to study University administration at the University of Warwick in the UK and also trained at the International Institute of Educational Planning at Paris (France).

Career
Akhtar worked for fifteen years at the National Institute of Educational Planning and Administration, leading courses for senior officials from 130 countries. She established the first state-level management institute at Allahabad and was the Controller of Examination and Director of Academic Programs at Aligarh Muslim University. She has been a consultant to UNESCO, UNICEF and DANIDA.

In April 2019, the Ministry of Human Resource Development received approval from the President of India, Ram Nath Kovind, to appoint Akhtar as vice chancellor of Jamia Millia Islamia for a five year term. Akhtar has been an advocate for gender equity and is known for leading teams of diverse cultural backgrounds. She said her goal is to establish a medical college at Jamia during her tenure. Of her appointment as the first female vice chancellor in the university's 99 year history, she said, "My aim was not to break the glass ceiling but I was definitely against the glass ceiling. Why is it even there, if you hold the same educational qualifications and experience?”

In 2022, Akhtar was awarded with Padma Shri by the Government of India. On 19 January 2023, she was conferred with the honorary rank of Colonel and appointed “Colonel Commandant” of the University.

References

1953 births
20th-century Indian women scientists
21st-century Indian women scientists
Heads of universities and colleges in India
Academic staff of Jamia Millia Islamia
Living people
Place of birth missing (living people)
Women academic administrators